Sentimental Journey: Pop Vocal Classics is a four-CD album issued by Rhino Records in 1993.

Track listing

Volume 1 (1942 - 1946)

Volume 2 (1947 - 1950)

Volume 3 (1950 - 1954)

Volume 4 (1954 - 1959)

1993 compilation albums
Pop compilation albums
Rhino Records compilation albums